

This is a list of properties and historic districts on the National Register of Historic Places in the West End of Louisville, Kentucky. The table below includes 49 listings in the following neighborhoods:

Latitude and longitude coordinates of the sites listed on this page may be displayed in a map or exported in several formats by clicking on one of the links in the box below the map to the right.

National Register sites elsewhere in Jefferson County are listed separately.

Current listings

|}

See also
 National Register of Historic Places listings in Jefferson County, Kentucky
 List of National Historic Landmarks in Kentucky
 List of attractions and events in the Louisville metropolitan area

References

West End